A Chinese finger trap (also known as a Chinese finger puzzle, Chinese thumb cuff, Chinese handcuffs, and similar variants) is a gag toy used to play a practical joke on unsuspecting children and adults. The finger trap is a simple puzzle that traps the victim's fingers (often the index fingers) in both ends of a small cylinder woven from bamboo.  The initial reaction of the victim is often to pull their fingers outward, but this only tightens the trap. The way to escape the trap is to push the ends toward the middle, which enlarges the openings and frees the fingers. The single-ended version, sold as a "girlfriend trap", has been available since at least 1870, when it was recorded as a "Mädchenfänger" or "girl catcher".

Design 
The tightening is simply a normal behavior of a cylindrical, helically wound braid, usually the common biaxial braid. Pulling the entire braid lengthens and narrows it. The length is gained by reducing the angle between the warp and weft threads at their crossing points, but this reduces the radial distance between opposing sides and hence the overall circumference. The more one pulls, the more the circumference shrinks and the trap tightens. The same effect is used in specialized textile manufacturing, the Vivien Kellems cable grip, Indonesian woven fruit presses, and by fly-fishers.

Chinese finger traps are not intended for use as restraint devices. Victims of the prank may break the bamboo strips through physical strength when they pull outwards, attempting to free their fingers and stretching the trap beyond its limits.

Variants

One variation on the Chinese finger trap has uses in orthopedic medicine—namely, providing even pressure to the patient's digit(s) and at the same time immobilizing the joints—and serves a similar purpose as a traction device. Its development goes back to Austria in 1870 when Dr. Steinberger, a dentist at the Rudolfsspital in Vienna, reported the discovery of his doctoral student Schmall, who got the idea to use the toy ″Mädchenfänger" (girl catcher) for the extension of fingers and arms. The principle was adapted for the use in surgery, and already in 1873 termed "Schmall'sches Extensionsgeflecht".

Another variant is the towing sock. It uses the same principle to seize the end of a cable to be pulled through a tube or tunnel.

Cultural influence 
The Chinese finger trap is a common metaphor for a problem that can be overcome by relaxing, i.e. not trying too hard to solve it; for example, in acceptance and commitment therapy. 
The gag has been used in a number of films and television productions, such as the Stan Laurel short Dr. Pyckle and Mr. Pryde (1925); the Our Gang short Moan and Groan, Inc., where they are referred to as Japanese handcuffs (1929); "Romance on the Range" (1942); "The Beast with Twenty Fingers" episode of Dobie Gillis; the "This Little Wiggy" episode of the American show The Simpsons in 1998; the "Fore, Father" episode of the show Family Guy in 2000;  the Dexter's Laboratory episode "Unfortunate Cookie"; the Milo Murphy's Law episode "Murphy's Lard" (in which the title character Milo is revealed to have a phobia of them); The Addams Family in 1991; the 1987 Star Trek: The Next Generation episode "The Last Outpost", in which Lt. Commander Data is stumped by the device; and the Bob's Burgers episode "Midday Run". The trap was featured in the book series The Heroes of Olympus, most notably The Mark of Athena, the joke a source of humor and a solution in the climax. The trap is featured in the Eric Andre film Bad Trip, and more recently, in the Apple TV+ series Severance where it is one of the rewards given to employees for productivity.

See also
Peace Bridge (Calgary), nicknamed "Finger Trap Bridge"

References

External links
 

Fingers
Practical joke devices
Novelty items